The Special Capital Region of Jakarta, located on the north coast of western Java, has thirteen major rivers.

List of rivers

See also 
 List of rivers of Indonesia
 List of rivers of Java

References 

 
Jakarta